George Hersee (29 December 1924 – 11 April 2001) was a BBC engineer, who is most famous for his development of Test Card F. This design came about after Hersee was asked to intervene by the committee charged with the creation of technical standards for the new colour TV services.

Hersee was born in Sussex, England. He was educated at Chichester Boys School and attended the University of Southampton, where he studied electrical engineering. In 1949, he joined the BBC's Planning & Installation Department, which equipped the BBC studios. By the late 1950s, he was specialising in lens and test card transparency specifications and became one of the leaders in this new field. 

The BBC had first begun to use television test cards in the 1930s, and by the mid 1960s it was realised that a new colour card was required, with particular attention being paid to the accuracy of skin tones. Hersee's now-iconic Test Card F from 1967 features a photograph of Carole, his eldest daughter, to meet that requirement.

Hersee published a monograph in 1967 entitled "A Survey of the Development of Television Test Cards Used in the BBC", but left the BBC in 1979 to work for a private engineering company.

He died at age 76, and was survived by his wife and two daughters, Carole and Gillian.

See also
Test Card J
Test Card W
Test card
List of BBC test cards
Bubbles the Clown

References

External links
University of Southampton magazine
Test card special
Carole Hersee interview - 40th anniversary of test card F
 The Story of Carole Hersee - The BBC Test Card Girl (documentary on Youtube)

1924 births
2001 deaths
Alumni of the University of Southampton
People from West Sussex